China Doll (a.k.a. Time Is a Memory) is a 1958 romantic drama film set in the China Burma India Theater of World War II and starring Victor Mature and Li Li-Hua. It represented a return to films for director Frank Borzage who had taken a 10-year hiatus before tackling this poignant, yet "offbeat" film.

The film's copyright was renewed.

Plot
In 1943, Captain Cliff Brandon (Victor Mature) is a cargo aircraft pilot supplying the Allied troops fighting the Japanese in China. When he is not flying or training his new crew hard, he is usually drinking in the local bar.

One night, while stumbling home drunk, he encounters an old Chinese man who offers him a girl, his daughter Shu-Jen (Li Li-Hua). Brandon pays him, but when he sees the young woman, he tells the old man to keep her. When he wakes up the next morning, he finds Shu-Jen there. After Father Cairns (Ward Bond), a longtime resident of China, expresses his disapproval, Brandon tries his best to get rid of her, assigning the task to Ellington, a young Chinese boy who speaks English well. Ellington tries to sell her into prostitution, but Father Cairns happens by and takes Shu-Jen back to Brandon.

The priest finds out that Shu-Jen's father was a farmer, but he lost his land to the Japanese invaders. Destitute, he sold his daughter's services for three months to feed the rest of his large family. Cairns tells Brandon that, if he were to send the girl back, the old man would return the desperately needed money. So, over Brandon's protests, the priest gets him to keep the girl; Brandon tells her that she is there only as a housekeeper. He makes Ellington his live-in interpreter.

Over time, however, love blooms, and Shu-Jen becomes pregnant. They get married in a traditional Chinese ceremony. After he is transferred to another base, she gives birth to their daughter. Later, they are reunited.

While Brandon is flying a mission, the base is attacked. The returning flight is ordered to divert to a different airfield, but Brandon disobeys and lands his aircraft. When he cannot locate his family, he orders his crew to leave with the survivors. Then he finds Shu-Jen and Ellington both dead, but his daughter is alive. He puts his dog tag around her neck, then mans an anti-aircraft gun and shoots down one or two enemy aircraft before he is killed.

In 1957, his former crewmates and their wives anxiously await the arrival in the United States of Brandon's daughter, found in an orphanage by Father Cairns, still with her father's dog tag.

Cast
As appearing in China Doll, (main roles and screen credits identified):
 Victor Mature as Capt. Cliff Brandon
 Li Li-Hua as Shu-Jen
 Ward Bond as Father Cairns
 Bob Mathias as Capt. Phil Gates
 Johnny Desmond as Sgt. Steve Hill
 Stuart Whitman as Lt. Dan O'Neill, Navigator (as Stu Whitman)
 Elaine Devry as Alice Nichols (as Elaine Curtis)
 Ann McCrea as Mona Perkins
 Danny Chang as Ellington
 Denver Pyle as Col. Wiley, Brandon's commanding officer
 Don "Red" Barry as MSgt. Hal Foster
 Tige Andrews as Cpl. Carlo Menotti
 Steve Mitchell as Dave Reisner
 Ken Perry as Sgt. Ernie Fleming
 Ann Paige as Sally
 Gregg Barton as Airman
 Bill White, Jr. as Forsyth, Flying Tiger

Production
China Doll had lingered on Borzage's desk from 1953 as an earlier story, The China Story. Starting out with the working title of Time Is a Memory, the film was the first co-production of Batjac Productions and Romina Productions; the next and last co-production was Escort West (1959), a western, also starring Victor Mature.

Borzage had been a successful director throughout the 1920s and reached his peak in the late silent and early sound era with such noted films as Seventh Heaven (1927), Street Angel (1928), Bad Girl (1931) and A Farewell to Arms (1932). During the 1940s, his films were not as well received and after the film noir, Moonrise (1948), Borzage had stopped directing. China Doll marked his return to Hollywood, although he only completed one more film, The Big Fisherman (1959), while his last effort, L'Atlantide (1961), had to be finished by others due to his illness.

The film was also known as Time is a Memory and shooting started 15 August 1957.

Borzage and Victor Mature intended China Doll to be the first of several films they would make together, others including The Incorrigibles and Vaults of Heaven.

Principal photography took place in 1958 with location shooting at Saugus, California. To faithfully recreate the Kunming Airfield, documentary footage from World War II was incorporated. Although aerial action in China Doll took a secondary role compared to the melodrama that predominated, the following aircraft were featured: 
 Bell P-39 Airacobra fighters
 Consolidated B-24 Liberator bombers
 Curtiss P-40 Warhawk fighters
 Douglas C-47 Skytrain transports 
 Grumman F6F Hellcat fighters
 Grumman TBF Avenger bombers
 Kawasaki Ki-61 fighter
 Mitsubishi Ki-21 medium bombers
 Mitsubishi Ki-51 light bomber
 Northrop A-17 bomber
 Republic P-47 Thunderbolt fighter

Li Li Hua had been under contract to Cecil B. De Mille who had considered her for The Buccaneer.

Reception
Considered a modest but interesting film, China Doll received favorable critical reviews. Variety noted the film had, "the warmth and humor of a romance between a burly air corps captain and a fragile oriental beauty." Howard Thompson, reviewer for The New York Times found it "(a) familiar war drama (that) has some winning aspects. ... Under Mr. Borzage's leisurely, gentle staging, the love story dominates the picture."

More recent reviews have treated China Doll as one of Borzage's best and a fitting penultimate testament to his career. A lengthy review by Dan Callahan laid out the tropes of his earlier works were present: "China Doll is a delicate, spare, old man's movie, with quiet attention to character detail (even Ward Bond's priest is sensitive and thoughtful). There's a melancholy, pessimistic slant to the dialogue that isn't lingered over; the movements of the actors and the compositions are so stylized and presentational that it almost feels, at magical times, like a silent film. The ending is surprisingly violent, even brutal, but in a brief coda, Borzage observes the regeneration of beauty in the couple's child, even as he has shown the lovers' bond and their kindness viciously wiped out by war."

See also
 List of American films of 1958

References
Notes

Citations

Bibliography

 Dumont, Hervé. Frank Borzage: The Life and Films of a Hollywood Romantic. Jefferson, North Carolina: McFarland, 2009, First edition 2006. . 
 Evans, Alun. Brassey's Guide to War Films. Dulles, Virginia: Potomac Books, 2000. .
 Herzogenrath, Bernd.  The Films of Edgar G. Ulmer. Lanham, Maryland: Scarecrow Press, 2009. . 
 Parish, James Robert and Don E. Stanke. The Swashbucklers. Highland City, Florida: Rainbow Books, 1980. .

External links

American romantic drama films
American black-and-white films
Films directed by Frank Borzage
Second Sino-Japanese War films
World War II aviation films
Batjac Productions films
Films produced by John Wayne
Films produced by Frank Borzage
1950s English-language films
1950s American films